Paul Watzlawick (July 25, 1921 – March 31, 2007) was an Austrian-American family therapist, psychologist, communication theorist, and philosopher. A theoretician in communication theory and radical constructivism, he commented in the fields of family therapy and general psychotherapy. Watzlawick believed that people create their own suffering in the very act of trying to fix their emotional problems. He was one of the most influential figures at the Mental Research Institute and lived and worked in Palo Alto, California.

Early life and education
Paul Watzlawick was born in Villach, Austria in 1921, the son of a bank director. After he graduated from high school in 1939, Watzlawick studied philosophy and philology at the Università Ca' Foscari Venice – even though the Faculty of Philosophy was not established before 1969 – and earned a PhD (doctor of philosophy degree) in 1949. He then studied at the Carl Jung Institute in Zurich, where he received a degree in analytical psychology in 1954. In 1957 he continued his research career at the University of El Salvador.

Career
In 1960, Don. D. Jackson arranged for him to go to Palo Alto to do research at the Mental Research Institute (MRI). Starting in 1967 he taught psychiatry at Stanford University. 
At the Mental Research Institute Watzlawick followed in the footsteps of Gregory Bateson and the research team (Don D. Jackson, John Weakland, Jay Haley) responsible for introducing what became known as the "double bind" theory of schizophrenia. Double bind can be defined as a person trapped under mutually exclusive expectations. Watzlawick's 1967 work based on Bateson's thinking, Pragmatics of Human Communication (with Don Jackson and Janet Beavin), became a cornerstone work of communication theory. Other scientific contributions include works on radical constructivism and most importantly his theory on communication. He was active in the field of family therapy.

Watzlawick was one of the three founding members of the Brief Therapy Center at MRI. In 1974, members of the Center published a major work on their brief approach, Change, Principles of Problem Formation and Problem Resolution (Watzlawick, Weakland, Fisch).
He was licensed as a psychologist in California from 1969 until 1998, when he stopped seeing patients.

Personal life
Watzlawick was married (Vera) and had two stepdaughters (Yvonne and Joanne). A cardiac arrest at his home in Palo Alto caused his death at the age of 85.

Work

Interactional view 

Watzlawick did extensive research on how communication is effected within families. Watzlawick defines five basic axioms in his theory on communication, popularly known as the "Interactional View". The Interactional View is an interpretive theory drawing from the cybernetic tradition. Watzlawick  considered five axioms as a prerequisite for functioning communication process and competence between two individuals or an entire family. According to him, miscommunication happens because not all of the communicators are "speaking the same language". This happens because people have different viewpoints of speaking. With an underlying cybernetic structure, Watzawick considered causality of a circular, feedback nature, with information as a core element. it is concerned with the processes of communication within systems of the widest sense and therefore also with human systems, e.g., families, large organizations and international relations.

within the "Interactional View" communication is based on what is happening, and not necessarily associated with who, when, where, or why it takes place. he studied "Normal" as well as the "disturbed" family in order to infer conditions conducive to the approach of interaction-orientation. He believed that individual personality, character, and deviance are shaped by the individual's relations with his fellows. He saw symptoms, defenses, character structure and personality as terms describing the individual's typical interactions, which occur in response to a particular interpersonal context.

Five basic axioms 
The Interactional View requires a network of communication rules that govern a family homeostasis, which is the tacit collusion of family members to maintain the status quo. Even if the status quo is negative it can still be hard to change. Interactional theorists believe that a person will fail to recognize this destructive resistance to change unless he or she understand Watzlawick's axioms. The following axioms can explain how miscommunication can occur if not all the communicators are on the same page. If one of these axioms is somehow disturbed, communication might fail. All of these axioms are derived from the work of Gregory Bateson, much of which is collected in Steps to an Ecology of Mind (1972).

Watzlawick, Beavin Bavelas and Jackson support these axioms to maintain family homeostasis.
 One cannot not communicate: Every behavior is a form of communication. Because behavior does not have a counterpart (there is no anti-behavior), it is impossible not to communicate. Even if communication is being avoided (such as the unconscious use of non-verbals or symptom strategy), that is a form of communication. "Symptom strategy" is ascribing our silence to something beyond our control and makes no communication impossible. Examples of symptom strategy are sleepiness, headaches, and drunkenness. Even facial expressions, digital communication, and being silent can be analyzed as communication by a receiver.
 Every communication has a content and relationship aspect such that the latter classifies the former and is therefore a metacommunication: All communication includes, apart from the plain meaning of words, more information. This information is based on how the speaker wants to be understood and how he himself sees his relation to the receiver of information. Relationship is the command part of the message or how it is non-verbally said. Content is the report or what is said verbally. Being able to interpret both of these aspects is essential in understanding something that a communicator said. The relational aspect of interaction is known as metacommunication. Metacommunication is communication about communication. Relationship messages are always the most important element in communication.
 The nature of a relationship is dependent on the punctuation of the partners' communication procedures (punctuation as translated from "Interpunktion" in German) : Both the sender and the receiver of information structure the communication flow differently and therefore interpret their own behavior during communicating as merely a reaction on the other's behavior (i.e., every partner thinks the other one is the cause of a specific behavior). To "punctuate" a communication means to interpret an ongoing sequence of events by labeling one event as the cause or beginning, and the following event as the response.  In a situation with communication, if one thing happens, something else always happens. For example, a female in a relationship with a male is feeling depressed. The male in the relationship with the female feels guilty. One who observes this situation might ask, "Is she depressed because of his guilt, or does he feel guilty because of her depression?"
 Human communication involves both digital and analog modalities: This axiom refers back to the use of non-verbals and system strategy explained in the first axiom. It is mostly related to the digital content of communication within a relationship.
 Inter-human communication procedures are either symmetric or complementary: This axiom focuses on metacommunication with two main components called symmetrical interchange and complementary interchange. Symmetrical interchange is an interaction based on equal power between communicators. In accordance to that, complementary interchange is an interaction based on differences in power. Within these two interchanges there are three different ways they can be used: one-up, one-down, and one-across. With a one-up communication, one communicator attempts to gain control of an exchange by dominating the overall communication. A one-down communication has the opposite effect. A communicator attempts to yield control of an interaction or submit to someone. The final message is a one-across communication. This communication moves to neutralize a situation. This is also called transitory if only one communicator is attempting this style. When two communicators use the same style of one-up, one-down, or one-across, it is symmetrical. If they are opposing one another it is complementary. This axiom allows us to understand how an interaction can be perceived by the styles a communicator is using.

Additional notions 
Some interrelated notions that make up the Interactional View promoted by Watzlawick and colleagues at the MRI include:
 One cannot not communicate, and the related idea that one cannot not influence;
 Understanding behavior as if we are constantly exchanging messages defining the nature of relationships of which we are a part;
 Shifting focus of attention from intent to the effects of behavior as communication;
 Observer-imposed punctuation;
 Emphasizing the vital role of the therapist's preconceptions in bringing forth socially constructed reality;
 Investing the ramifications of self-fulfilling prophecy; and
 Articulating and fully embracing the "as If" nature of behavior.

A term that is used often in the theory of the Interactional View is enabler. An enabler is within addiction culture; a person whose non-assertive behavior allows others to continue in their substance abuse. An example of this would be a person letting their sibling continue to act in an immature manner because that is what the family is used to him doing.

Another word frequently used in the Interactional View is double-bind. Someone in a double-bind, is a person trapped by expectations; the powerful party requests that the low-power party act symmetrically. An example of this would be a person asking another person, "Why didn't you like the movie?" or "You like rock 'n' roll, don't you?" The first person is asking the second person to act in a way that is similar (symmetrical) to them.

Criticisms 
The critique of this theory can be centered on one main thing: the application of the theory as a whole. Being able to take these axioms and apply them to relationships between families can be very difficult to master. It can be said that this theory is trapped because it is so hard to apply. Also, the theory itself does not claim and exact applications other than "reframing". Reframing asks the communicators to step outside of the situation and reinterpret what it means. This can be hard because the theory states that only an outside source can see a problem because people are "speaking their own language".

This theory also shows how a relationship has already changed, but it does not give practical ways to go about changing it. This system resists change and it can be hard to actively use the five axioms. Related to the first axiom, non-verbal communication can be viewed as informative rather than communicative. With the behavioral characteristic of equifinality involved, it is hard to know when the system of the Interactional View is happening or not. Equifinality is the systems theory assumption that a given outcome could have occurred due to any or many interconnected factors rather than being a result in a cause—effect relationship. This theory rests on the word communication, but this word can be interpreted very differently between people. The definitions of communication can be very controversial. Overall, the axioms do a great job of explaining problems, but do not provide solutions to the problems they bring up.

Publications 
Watzlawick wrote 22 books that were translated into 80 languages for academic and general audiences with more than 150 scientific articles and book chapters. Books he has written or on which he has collaborated include:
 An Anthology of Human Communication, 1964
 Watzlawick, P., Beavin-Bavelas, J., Jackson, D. 1967. Some Tentative Axioms of Communication. In  Pragmatics of Human Communication - A Study of Interactional Patterns, Pathologies and Paradoxes. W. W. Norton, New York, 1967, 
 Change: Principles of Problem Formation and Problem Resolution (with John Weakland and Richard Fisch), 1974,  W W Norton page
 How Real Is Real?, 1976, 
 The Language of Change, 1977,  W W Norton page
 Gebrauchsanweisung für Amerika, 1978
 The Situation Is Hopeless, But Not Serious: The Pursuit of Unhappiness, 1983,  W W Norton page
 The Invented Reality: How Do We Know What We Believe We Know? (Contributions to Constructivism), 1984, 
 Ultra-Solutions, or, How to Fail Most Successfully, 1988, 
 The Interactional View: studies at the Mental Research Institute, Palo Alto, 1965–1974, 1977
 Munchausen's Pigtail and other Essays, 1990

Legacy 
Paul Watzlawick theory had great impact on the creation of the four sides model by Friedemann Schulz von Thun.

Michel Weber argues for a cross-elucidation and reinforcement between the worldviews of Alfred North Whitehead and Watzlawick in his paper "The Art of Epochal Change".

References

1921 births
2007 deaths
People from Villach
American philosophers
20th-century American psychologists
Austrian emigrants to the United States
Communication theorists
Constructivism (psychological school)
Family therapists
Humor researchers
People from Palo Alto, California
Stanford University School of Medicine faculty
Systems scientists
20th-century Austrian philosophers